Bubka is a Ukrainian surname. People with that name include:

 Sergey Bubka (born 1963), Ukrainian pole vaulter
 Vasiliy Bubka (born 1960), Ukrainian pole vaulter, brother of Sergey
 Oleksandr Bubka (born 1986), Ukrainian pole vaulter, son of Vasiliy
 Sergei Bubka (born 1987), Ukrainian tennis player, son of Sergey